Michael Jefferson Nascimento (born 21 January 1982), known as Michael, is a Brazilian professional football coach and former player who is the assistant coach of EC São Bernardo. He played as a midfielder from 1997 until 2015, notably for Japanese club Albirex Niigata.

Club statistics
Statistics accurate as of 31 January 2012.

1Includes Emperor's Cup.
2Includes J. League Cup.

Club titles
São Paulo State League (2nd division): 2000, 2003
Brazilian Cup: 2002
Goiás State League: 2004

References

External links

1982 births
Living people
Brazilian footballers
Brazilian expatriate footballers
Associação Desportiva São Caetano players
Sport Club Corinthians Paulista players
Grêmio Barueri Futebol players
Avaí FC players
Guaratinguetá Futebol players
Associação Atlética Ponte Preta players
Coritiba Foot Ball Club players
JEF United Chiba players
Albirex Niigata players
J1 League players
Campeonato Brasileiro Série A players
Expatriate footballers in Japan
São Bernardo Futebol Clube players
Esporte Clube Santo André players
Association football midfielders
Footballers from São Paulo (state)